24260 Kriváň, provisional designation , is a stony Eunomian asteroid from the middle region of the asteroid belt, approximately 8 kilometers in diameter. It was discovered by Slovak astronomer Peter Kušnirák at the Czech Ondřejov Observatory on 13 December 1999, and named after the Kriváň mountain peak in Slovakia.

Orbit and classification 

The asteroid is a member of the Eunomia family, a large group of stony S-type asteroids and the most prominent family in the intermediate main-belt. It orbits the Sun in the central main-belt at a distance of 2.3–2.9 AU once every 4 years and 2 months (1,530 days). Its orbit has an eccentricity of 0.13 and an inclination of 14° with respect to the ecliptic. The first precovery was taken at the Australian Siding Spring Observatory in 1976, extending the asteroid's observation arc by 23 years prior to its discovery.

Physical characteristics 

In December 2011, a rotational lightcurve was obtained for this asteroid from photometric observation by U.S. astronomer James W. Brinsfield at the Via Observatory in Thousand Oaks, California. It gave a well-defined rotation period of  hours with a brightness variation of 0.42 in magnitude.

According to the survey carried out by the NEOWISE mission of NASA's Wide-field Infrared Survey Explorer, the asteroid measures 8.3 kilometers in diameter and its surface has an albedo of 0.28, while the Collaborative Asteroid Lightcurve Link assumes a standard albedo of 0.21 – derived from 15 Eunomia, the family's largest member and namesake – and calculates a diameter of 8.4 kilometers with an absolute magnitude of 12.7.

Naming 

This minor planet was named after the Kriváň mountain, located in the High Tatras of Slovakia. It is considered to be the country's most beautiful peak and one of its national symbols. The approved naming citation was published by the Minor Planet Center on 4 August 2001.

References

External links 
 Asteroid Lightcurve Database (LCDB), query form (info )
 Dictionary of Minor Planet Names, Google books
 Asteroids and comets rotation curves, CdR – Observatoire de Genève, Raoul Behrend
 Discovery Circumstances: Numbered Minor Planets (20001)-(25000) – Minor Planet Center
 
 

024260
Discoveries by Peter Kušnirák
Named minor planets
19991213